Marie-Andrea Egli is a Swiss football defender currently playing for SC Kriens in the Nationalliga A. She has been a member of the Swiss national team since 2008.

References

1989 births
Living people
Swiss women's footballers
Switzerland women's international footballers
Women's association football defenders
Swiss Women's Super League players